is a railway station on the Keihin-Tōhoku Line and the Tokyo Metro Namboku Line, located in the  area of Kita, Tokyo. It is also a tram stop on the Tokyo Sakura Tram named .

Lines
 JR East - Ōji Station
 Tōhoku Main Line (Keihin-Tōhoku Line)
 Tokyo Metro - Oji Station
 Namboku Line
 Toei - Oji-ekimae Station
 Tokyo Sakura Tram

JR East

The Keihin-Tōhoku Line station consists of a single island platform serving two tracks.

Platforms

Tokyo Metro

The Namboku Line station consists of a single island platform serving two tracks.

Platforms

Toei

The Tokyo Sakura Tram station consists of two side platforms serving two tracks.

History
The station opened on 28 July 1883.

What is now the Toden Arakawa Line begins operation on 17 April 1915.

The Namboku Line subway station opened on 29 November 1991. It was inherited by Tokyo Metro after the privatization of the Teito Rapid Transit Authority (TRTA) in 2004.

References

External links

 Ōji Station (JR East) 
 Ōji Station (Tokyo Metro) 
 Ōji-ekimae Station (Toei) 

Keihin-Tōhoku Line
Railway stations in Tokyo
Tokyo Metro Namboku Line
Railway stations in Japan opened in 1883